Harold Castle (11 December 1861 – 4 February 1934) was a Jamaican cricketer. He played in five first-class matches for the Jamaican cricket team from 1894 to 1897.

See also
 List of Jamaican representative cricketers

References

External links
 

1861 births
1934 deaths
Jamaican cricketers
Jamaica cricketers